Le Haut-Saint-Maurice Regional County Municipality was a former regional county municipality and census division in the Mauricie region of Quebec, Canada. It was formed on January 1, 1982, and dissolved on March 26, 2003, when it was amalgamated in its entirety into the new City of La Tuque. The La Tuque census division, a territory equivalent to a regional county municipality, is contiguous with the former Le Haut-Saint-Maurice RCM.

Based on the last census prior to its dissolution, Le Haut-Saint-Maurice consisted of:

* Totals include the three native reserves of Coucoucache, Wemotaci, and Obedjiwan, but were not administratively part of the RCM.

Following a 2004 referendum, the municipalities of La Bostonnais and Lac-Édouard separated from La Tuque and were reestablished on January 1, 2006.  They are no longer incorporated within any regional county municipality, but remains part of the urban agglomeration of La Tuque.

See also 
 Municipal history of Quebec

References 

Former regional county municipalities in Quebec
Populated places disestablished in 2003